Bykovskaya is a rural locality (a village) in Mityukovskoye Rural Settlement, Vozhegodsky District, Vologda Oblast, Russia. The population was 3 as of 2002.

Geography 
The distance to Vozhega is 69 km, to Sosnovitsa is 1 km. Sigovskaya, Grishinskaya, Sosnovitsa are the nearest rural localities.

References 

Rural localities in Vozhegodsky District